Atif Mustafa Qarni (born 1978) is an American teacher, former military non commissioned officer, and a Democratic politician who was appointed by Governor Ralph Northam as Virginia Secretary of Education. Immigrating from Karachi, Pakistan, with his family at the age of ten, Qarni grew up in Parkville, Maryland, before moving to Manassas, Virginia in 2005. He served in the United States Marine Corps, was deployed to Iraq as part of Operation Iraqi Freedom, and rose to the rank of Sergeant. He served as a paralegal at the international law firm McDermott Will & Emery LLP before beginning a career in teaching. Qarni ran for a seat in the Virginia House of Delegates in 2013, losing to incumbent Bob Marshall, and for the Virginia Senate in 2015, losing the Democratic nomination to Jeremy McPike.

Electoral history

References

External links
 Virginia Secretary of Education

Living people
1978 births
State cabinet secretaries of Virginia
Virginia Democrats
Asian-American people in Virginia politics
United States Marine Corps personnel of the Iraq War
George Washington University alumni
George Mason University alumni
Strayer University alumni
Pakistani emigrants to the United States
American politicians of Pakistani descent
People from Manassas, Virginia
Candidates in the 2013 United States elections